Turriff East is a town in the Shire of Buloke, Victoria, Australia. The post office there opened on 16 October 1918 and was closed on 20 December 1940.

References